André Lacroix is the name of:

André Lacroix (businessman) (born 1960), French businessman
André Lacroix (ice hockey) (born 1945), retired Canadian ice hockey player
André Lacroix (tennis) (died 1992), Belgian tennis player
André Lacroix (pentathlete) (born 1921), French pentathlete